The 1975 Toray Sillook Open  was a women's tennis tournament played on indoor carpet courts in Tokyo and Osaka, Japan that was a non-tour event, independent of the 1975 WTA Tour. It was the third edition of the tournament and was held from 16 September through 19 September 1975. The first round was played at the Yoyogi National Gymnasium in Tokyo while the semifinals and final were held in Osaka. Second-seeded Margaret Court won the singles title and earned $16,000 first-prize money.

Finals

Singles
 Margaret Court defeated  Evonne Goolagong 6–7(4–5), 6–1, 7–5

Doubles
 Margaret Court /  Evonne Goolagong defeated  Helen Gourlay /  Ann Kiyomura 6–1, 7–5

Prize money

References

Toray Sillook Open
Pan Pacific Open
Toray Sillook Open
Sports competitions in Tokyo
Toray Sillook Open
Toray Sillook Open
Toray Sillook Open